Ryota Doi (土井 良太, born August 27, 1987) is a Japanese football player for Fujieda MYFC.

Club career statistics
Updated to 23 February 2017.

References

External links

Profile at Vissel Kobe
Profile at Fujieda MYFC

1987 births
Living people
Association football people from Hyōgo Prefecture
Japanese footballers
J1 League players
J2 League players
J3 League players
Japan Football League players
Vissel Kobe players
Japan Soccer College players
Arte Takasaki players
Thespakusatsu Gunma players
Iwate Grulla Morioka players
AC Nagano Parceiro players
Fujieda MYFC players
Association football forwards